John Keller Griffith (October 16, 1882 – September 25, 1942) was a member of the United States House of Representatives from Louisiana's 6th congressional district.

Born in Baton Rouge, he earned a college degree from Louisiana State University and then his Doctor of Medicine degree from Tulane University in New Orleans. He served in the United States Army Medical Corps during World War I. He worked for a physician at the insane asylum in Jackson, Louisiana.

In 1936, Griffith was elected as a Democrat to the first of two terms in Congress, having unseated Jared Y. Sanders, Jr., of Baton Rouge in the primary. However, he was defeated by Sanders in 1940 in a renomination bid for a third term. He died shortly after Sanders himself was unseated in District 6 by the long-term Representative James H. Morrison of Hammond, Louisiana.

References
Congress biography

1882 births
1942 deaths
Tulane University School of Medicine alumni
Democratic Party members of the United States House of Representatives from Louisiana
Louisiana State University alumni
Physicians from Louisiana
20th-century American politicians